Termarr Johnson (born June 11, 2004) is an American professional baseball shortstop in the Pittsburgh Pirates organization.

Amateur career
Johnson attended Benjamin Elijah Mays High School in Atlanta, Georgia. In 2019, played for the 2019 USA Baseball 15U National Team that won a gold medal. During the summer of 2021, Johnson participated in the Breakthrough Series. He also played in the High School All-American Game as well as participating in the All-Star High School Home Run Derby at Coors Field in which he finished in third place with 24 home runs. That same summer, he participated in the Perfect Game All-American Classic Home Run Derby which won. That October, he was named to the 2021 USA Baseball 18U National Team.

Johnson entered his senior season in 2022 as a top-five prospect for the upcoming draft. During his senior year, he committed to play college baseball at Arizona State University. Following the season's end, he traveled to San Diego where he participated in the Draft Combine.

Professional career
The Pittsburgh Pirates selected Johnson in the first round, with the fourth overall selection, of the 2022 Major League Baseball draft. Johnson signed with the Pirates and received a $7,219,000 signing bonus.

Johnson made his professional debut with the Rookie-level Florida Complex League Pirates. After nine games, he was promoted to the Bradenton Marauders of the Single-A Florida State League. Over 23 games between the two teams, he batted .222 with one home run, six RBIs, and six stolen bases.

References

External links

2004 births
Living people
Baseball players from Atlanta
Baseball shortstops
Florida Complex League Pirates players
Bradenton Marauders players